KMMZ (101.3 FM, "La Caliente 101.3") is an American radio station licensed by the Federal Communications Commission (FCC) to serve Crane, Texas, which is part of the Midland–Odessa metropolitan area. KMMZ is owned by Maria Teresa and Humberto Jimenez, through licensee Permian Basin Broadcasting, LLC.

Formerly an adult standards station known as "Memories 101.3," the current Spanish norteño music music format began in early 2007.

References

External links

MMZ
MMZ